"You Look So Good in Love" is a song written by Glen Ballard, Rory Bourke and Kerry Chater, and recorded by American country music artist George Strait.  It was released in September 1983 as the lead single from his album Right or Wrong. It was also recorded by Mickey Gilley in 1983, appearing on his album You've Really Got a Hold on Me.

Content
The narrator is a guy looking at his ex-lover fall in love with another guy. He realizes just how happy his former girlfriend looks now that she's fallen in true love. He feels sorry for himself that he wasn't the one to make her happy, but part of him realizes it wasn't meant to be.

Music video
A video — Strait's first — was issued for the song. Strait disliked the "slow-paced and romantic themed" video so he asked for it to be taken off the air, and refused to do music videos for several years afterward.

Chart performance
The song debuted at number 31 on the Hot Country Songs charts, Strait's highest debut for many years. In January 1984, "You Look So Good in Love" was George Strait's third No. 1 song on the chart.

Weekly charts

Year-end charts

Certifications

References

1983 singles
George Strait songs
Mickey Gilley songs
Songs written by Glen Ballard
Songs written by Rory Bourke
Song recordings produced by Ray Baker (music producer)
Songs written by Kerry Chater
MCA Nashville Records singles
1983 songs